Patricio Colón was Mayor of the city of Ponce in 1838.

Biography
Colón was born in Ponce, Puerto Rico, around 1793. In 1838 he was an hacienda owner in Barrio Vayas, and owned five slaves.  He married Marcelina Manfredi y Figueroa, with whom he had five children: Angela (ca. 1810) Joseph (ca. 1820), Joseph de Jesus (ca. 1824), Carmen (ca. 1826), and Eduviges (ca. 1829).

References

See also

Ponce, Puerto Rico
List of Puerto Ricans

Mayors of Ponce, Puerto Rico
1790s births
Year of death missing